Firdavs Abduzhalilovich Chakalov (born 24 February 1996) is a Tajikistani international footballer who plays as a defender for Uzbekistan Super League side Turon Yaypan.

Career
In June 2018, Chakalov moved to Victory from FK Khujand.

On 14 January 2019, Chakalov returned to FK Khujand.

International
Chakalov made his international debut in a 2–1 2019 AFC Asian Cup qualification victory against Nepal, replacing Davron Ergashev in the 74th minute.

Career statistics

International

Statistics accurate as of match played 29 March 2022

References

External links
 

1996 births
Living people
Tajikistani footballers
Tajikistani expatriate footballers
Tajikistan international footballers
Association football defenders
Tajikistan Higher League players